Hebei Medical University is a university in Shijiazhuang, Hebei, China, under the provincial government. It was established in 1894, making it one of the oldest, and is an AAA graded medical school in China. 

Located in Shijiazhuang, the capital city of Hebei Province which is 4 hours away from Beijing by car and 1 and a half hours by train.

Staff
The staff numbers are over 7,100. Of these, 366 are professors, senior researchers and chief physicians. There are 967 are associate professors.

Students
There are 25,600 students.

Hebei Medical University has long history of enrolling international students from countries including the United States, Japan, Korea, Philippines, Taiwan, the UK, India, Pakistan, Nepal and Bangladesh. Currently there are over 400 international students.
In collaboration with International Education College of Jiangxi University of Traditional Chinese Medicine, a total of more than 300 international students have already completed their Bachelor of Medicine, Bachelor of Surgery (MBBS) from the university in 2010–2011.

Colleges
After 80 years development and evolution, Hebei Medical University has become a comprehensive medical university composed of western medicine, traditional medicine, pharmacy and other subjects. Now there are 14 colleges, and 15 specialties.

Affiliated hospitals
The university has six affiliated hospitals, in which there are 4,566 in-patient beds. Four hospitals have been granted the status of "first-class hospitals in the third category". In addition, it also has 77 teaching hospitals and practice bases providing students with sites of clinical teaching, specialist teaching and practice.

Achievements
It carried out the first finger transplantation surgery in China, and made the first diagnosis in the world of acute motor axonal neuropathy.

It has 9 subjects and 4 laboratories assessed at advanced provincial  level, and 6 research institutes at provincial level. The Chinese Academy of Preventive Medical Science has set up its Hebei Academic Branch in this university. Each year nearly 200 research projects are undertaken. In addition three national and eight provincial academic periodicals have been compiled and published here.

Hebei Medical University has started the MBBS programme in 2004 and enrolled 200 students successfully from India and Nepal, and in 2005 enrolled 200 more students from India. Both batches have graduated in 2010 and 2011 respectively.

The MBBS programme is taught in English as well as many other courses, something that other universities cannot do, such as Traditional Chinese Medicine, Acupuncture and Massage, Clinical Medicine, Clinical Medicine of Integration of Traditional Chinese Medicine and Western Medicine, Stomatology, Anesthesiology, Preventive Medicine, Medical Imaging, Advanced Nursing Science, Chinese Pharmacology, Pharmacology, Pharmaceutics.

In the past few years, Hebei Medical University has become an important window of cultural and economic exchange with the world. It has established closer cooperation with about ten medical colleges and research institutes in Japan, South Korea, U.S.A and France successively. 24 foreign experts have been invited to take honorary positions in this university. Over 400 experts and professors have been sent abroad to give lectures or attend international academic conferences. Nearly 100 young teachers are studying assiduously abroad for PhD degrees. Its cooperation with the domestic colleges and universities has grown tremendously over the years.

Hebei Medical University is turning on a new look and making great efforts to establish a superior comprehensive medical university with local characteristics to meet the needs of socialist construction.

References

External links

 Official website

 
Universities in China with English-medium medical schools
Universities and colleges in Hebei
Medical schools in China
Educational institutions established in 1894
1894 establishments in China